Filip Stanković (born 25 February 2002) is a Serbian professional footballer who plays as a goalkeeper for Eredivisie club Volendam, on loan from  club Inter Milan.

Club career
Stanković is a youth academy graduate of Inter Milan. On 4 August 2021, Dutch club Volendam announced the signing of Stanković on a season-long loan deal. He made his professional debut on 6 August in a 2–2 draw against FC Eindhoven. Following 28 league appearances and achieving promotion to the Eredivisie on his first season, on 20 July 2022, Stanković officially re-joined Volendam on another one-year loan.

International career
Stanković is a Serbian youth international.

Personal life
Stanković is the son of former Serbian national team player Dejan Stanković. His younger brother Aleksandar Stanković is also a footballer. He is the nephew of former Slovenian national team player Milenko Ačimovič.

Career statistics

References

External links
 

2002 births
Living people
Footballers from Rome
Association football goalkeepers
Eerste Divisie players
Expatriate footballers in the Netherlands
FC Volendam players
Inter Milan players
Italian footballers
Italian people of Serbian descent
Serbian expatriate footballers
Serbian expatriate sportspeople in the Netherlands
Serbian footballers
Serbian people of Slovenian descent
Serbia youth international footballers
Serbia under-21 international footballers